Richard Bayard Kennelly, Jr. (born July 4, 1965) is an American rower.  He won a silver medal at the 1988 Olympic Games in the men's coxless fours, along with Thomas Bohrer David Krmpotich, and Raoul Rodriguez. His team also placed 4th in the 1992 Summer Olympics.

Kennelly was born in Boston, Massachusetts. He now coaches the boys crew program at Phillips Academy Andover.

He rowed for St. Paul's School (New Hampshire) and then Harvard (Class of 1987).  He returned to school in 1991 at the University of Virginia, graduating in 1995, with dual degrees (a masters in environmental planning and a Juris Doctor degree).

References

 

1965 births
Living people
American male rowers
Olympic silver medalists for the United States in rowing
Medalists at the 1988 Summer Olympics
World Rowing Championships medalists for the United States
Harvard College alumni
Harvard Crimson rowers
St. Paul's School (New Hampshire) alumni
University of Virginia School of Law alumni
Rowers at the 1988 Summer Olympics
Rowers at the 1992 Summer Olympics